Doxies Creek (also known as Doxeys Fork) is a stream in Chariton and 
Howard counties in the U.S. state of Missouri.

Doxies Creek has the name of John Doxey.

See also
List of rivers of Missouri

References

Rivers of Chariton County, Missouri
Rivers of Howard County, Missouri
Rivers of Missouri